Oakdale is a suburb of Poole in Dorset, England with a population of 10,949, increasing to 11,554 at the 2011 Census and shares boundaries with Creekmoor, Poole Town, Parkstone, Newtown and Canford Heath

Description 
The main type of land use in Oakdale is residential. There are also small private businesses such as convenience stores, take away restaurants and pubs, as well as a Texaco petrol station. Nearby, there is a small full-time library with an adult learning centre next door in the old premises of the Oakdale Middle School. The school moved to a new purpose-built site in 1997. The parish church is St George's, built in 1959–60 to the designs of Potter and Hare. There is a large allotment area, several fields and two play parks for children. The main road through Oakdale is the busy Wimborne Road, which forms part of the A35 road and leads to Fleetsbridge to the north and Poole Town Centre to the south. The home ground of Poole Town F.C. is at Tatnam Farm, and located in Oakdale.

Churches 

 St George's Church, Oakdale

Schools
The following schools are located in Oakdale:
Stanley Green First School
Oakdale Junior School
St Edward's Roman Catholic-Church of England School

Politics 
Oakdale is in the Poole parliamentary constituency. The suburb covers the ward of the same name for elections to Bournemouth, Christchurch and Poole Council.

References

External links

Areas of Poole